Checkmate is the fifth extended play (EP) by South Korean girl group Itzy. It was released on July 15, 2022, through JYP Entertainment, and Republic Records. The EP consists of seven tracks, including the lead single "Sneakers".

Checkmate was a commercial success and debuted at number one on South Korea's Circle Album Chart with 700,000 copies sold in the first week of release, marking Itzy's fourth number-one album on the chart and their highest-selling album to date. In September, the EP was certified Million by the Korea Music Content Association (KMCA) for surpassing 1,000,000 copies sold. It also debuted at number eight on the Billboard 200, becoming Itzy's first top-ten album in the United States.

Background and release 
On June 2, 2022, JYP Entertainment announced that Itzy would be returning with new music in July, which would be followed by their first world tour in support of the release. The announcement featured a promotion scheduler with details of the new EP as well as a partial schedule of the tour. The EP, Itzy's first new music in nine months since the release of their debut studio album Crazy in Love (2021), was announced to be entitled Checkmate with the lead single "Sneakers". On June 13, the group teaser photo was released. On July 11, a highlight medley teaser video for the album was released. The album alongside the music video for "Sneakers" were released on July 15.

Album cover
The original digital cover for Checkmate featured a dark aura with a single chess piece in the middle. On July 22, 2022, JYP changed the album cover with no prior announcement, in response to fans complaints that the original cover did not match the group's concept or promotions.

Accolades

Commercial performance
On July 15, JYP Entertainment announced that Checkmate had reached 720,665 pre-orders as of July 14, surpassing Twice's Formula of Love: O+T=<3 to become the fourth-most pre-ordered album by a Korean girl group. On Hanteo Chart, the album recorded over 472,394 copies in its first week of release. In South Korea, Checkmate debuted at number one with 700,000 copies sold on the Circle Album Chart for the week ending July 16, 2022, becoming Itzy's fourth number-one album and surpassing Crazy in Love (2021) as the group's best-selling album. In the United States, Checkmate landed at number eight on the Billboard 200 with 33,000 equivalent album units, of which 31,000 units were album sales. This marked Itzy's first top-ten album and their highest position on the chart, surpassing the number 11 ranking of Crazy in Love. In August 31, it is reported that the album has exceeded 1,000,000 sales on the Circle Chart.

Track listing

Notes

 "Racer" is sometime stylized as "RAC3R".

Charts

Weekly charts

Monthly charts

Year-end charts

Certifications and sales

Release history

References

2022 EPs
Itzy EPs
JYP Entertainment EPs
Korean-language EPs
Republic Records EPs